The genus Lonomia is a moderate-sized group of fairly cryptic saturniid moths from South America, famous not for the adults, but for their highly venomous caterpillars, which are responsible for a few deaths each year, especially in southern Brazil, and the subject of hundreds of published medical studies. They are commonly known as giant silkworm moth, a name also used for a wide range of other saturniid moths.

Description
The caterpillars are themselves extremely cryptic, blending in against the bark of trees, where the larvae commonly aggregate. The larvae, like most hemileucines, are covered with urticating hairs, but these caterpillars possess a uniquely potent anticoagulant venom.

Toxicity
A typical envenomation incident involves a person unknowingly leaning against, placing their hand on, or rubbing their arm against a group of these caterpillars that are gathered on the trunk of a tree. The effects of a dose from multiple caterpillars can be dramatic and severe, including massive internal hemorrhaging, kidney failure, and hemolysis. The resulting medical syndrome is sometimes called lonomiasis. Death may result, either rapidly or after many days following envenomation.

The  of the Lonomia venom is 0.19 mg for an 18–20 g mouse (IV); however, due to the small amount of venom in the bristles of the caterpillar, the rate of human fatality is only 1.7%.

While there are more than a dozen species in the genus, the most troublesome species is Lonomia obliqua, and it is this species on which most of the medical research has centered. As anticoagulants have some very beneficial applications (e.g., prevention of life-threatening blood clots) the research is motivated by the possibility of deriving some pharmaceutically valuable chemicals from the toxin.

Species
 Lonomia achelous (Cramer, 1777) — Bolivia, Venezuela, Colombia, Ecuador, French Guiana, Brazil, Peru, Suriname
 Lonomia beneluzi Lemaire, 2002 — French Guiana
 Lonomia camox Lemaire, 1972 — Venezuela, French Guiana, Suriname
 Lonomia columbiana Lemaire, 1972 — Costa Rica, Panama, Colombia
 Lonomia descimoni Lemaire, 1972 — Bolivia, Colombia, Ecuador, French Guiana, Peru, Suriname, Brazil
 Lonomia diabolus Draudt, 1929 — Brazil, French Guiana
 Lonomia electra Druce, 1886 — Central America up to Mexico
 Lonomia francescae L. Racheli, 2005 — Ecuador
 Lonomia frankae Meister, Naumann, Brosch & Wenczel, 2005 — Peru
 Lonomia obliqua Walker, 1855 — Argentina, Brazil, Uruguay
 Lonomia pseudobliqua Lemaire, 1973 — Bolivia, Colombia, Ecuador, Venezuela, Peru
 Lonomia rufescens Lemaire, 1972 — Nicaragua to Panama, Colombia, Peru
 Lonomia serranoi Lemaire, 2002 — El Salvador
 Lonomia venezuelensis Lemaire, 1972 — Venezuela

Notes

References
American Journal of Tropical Medicine & Hygiene article on hemolytic effects
Arocha-Pinango C.L., Guerrero B. (2001) Lonomia genus caterpillar envenomation: clinical and biological aspects. Haemostasis 31(3–6):288-93.
Gamborgi G.P., Metcalf E.B., Barros E.J. (2006) Acute renal failure provoked by toxin from caterpillars of the species Lonomia obliqua. Toxicon 47(1):68–74.
Pinto A.F., Silva K.R., Guimaraes J.A. (2006) Proteases from Lonomia obliqua venomous secretions: comparison of procoagulant, fibrin(ogen)olytic and amidolytic activities. Toxicon 47(1):113-21.
Veiga A.B., Ribeiro J.M., Guimaraes J.A., Francischetti I.M. (2005) A catalog for the transcripts from the venomous structures of the caterpillar Lonomia obliqua: identification of the proteins potentially involved in the coagulation disorder and hemorrhagic syndrome. Gene 355:11–27.

External links
 Saturniidae World: Pictures of all species

Hemileucinae
Moth genera